Halley may refer to:

Science
 Halley's Comet, officially designated 1P/Halley, a comet that becomes visible from Earth every 75-76 years 
 Halley (lunar crater), a lunar crater named after Edmond Halley
 Halley (Martian crater), a Martian crater named after Edmond Halley
 Halley Research Station, a British research facility on the Brunt Ice Shelf floating on the Weddell Sea in Antarctica

Entertainment
 Halley (nightclub), a defunct Argentine nightclub
 "Halley" (song), the Turkish entrant to the Eurovision Song Contest 1986
 "Halley" (film), a 2012 Mexican horror movie

People
 Halley (surname), multiple people
 Edmond Halley (1656–1742), English astronomer
 Halley (given name), multiple people

See also  
Haley (disambiguation) 
Halle (disambiguation)
Hailey (disambiguation)
Hayley (disambiguation)
Hali (disambiguation)